This is a list of Brazilian films slated for release in 2018:

See also
 2018 in Brazil

References

External links
tv_series&year=2018,2018 Feature Films Released In 2018 With Country of Origin Brazil at IMDb

2018

Brazil